Samuel Lithgow  (1860 – 9 September 1937) was a British solicitor and property developer in Marylebone, London. He was a councillor of the London County Council and in 1891 founded the Stanhope Institute for Working Men and Women in Stanhope Street.

Early life and family
Samuel Lithgow was born in St Marylebone, London, in 1860. His father had died by the time Samuel was 10 and his mother Mary is described as running a "lodginghouse" in the 1871 census when the family were living in Marylebone. He had a sister Emma. By the time of the 1891 census the family were still living together, now in Wimpole Street, and Samuel was a solicitor. They were able to employ three servants.

He married Jessie Esther Grieve in 1894. She was born in Scotland and died in 1936. She was buried at Studland, Dorset. They had two sons Douglas and Lawrence. In 1911 the family were living in Northolt, Middlesex, and employed four servants.

Career

Lithgow was admitted as a solicitor in 1882 and later practiced as Messrs. Lithgow and Pepper, from 41 Wimpole Street.

Property development
Lithgow was active in property development in the Marylebone area of London. Among his notable developments was Wimpole House on the corner of Wimpole Street and New Cavendish Street at 28-29a Wimpole which was built for him as a speculative development in 1892–93 to a design by Charles Worley. The foundation stone was laid by his mother Mary Mason Lithgow in September 1892. When it was complete, Lithgow moved his business there and let some of the rooms to medical practitioners but most of the building was used as a nursing home until 1940 when the proprietor, a Miss Lancaster, died.

Politics and public service
Lithgow represented the West St Pancras ward on the London County Council from 1910 to 1913. He was a justice of the peace and chairman of the St. Marylebone and Paddington Local Employment and Juvenile Advisory Committees.

In 1891 he founded the Stanhope Institute for Working Men and Women, Stanhope Street. He was a governor of the North West London Polytechnic.

He was appointed CBE in 1928.

Death and legacy
Lithgow died on 9 September 1937 in a nursing home at Norwich after an operation. A memorial service was held at St John's Church, Hyde Park Crescent. His residence at the time of his death was stated to be 41 Wimpole Street and Thelverton Grange, Diss, Norfolk, but he also had homes at various times at 30 Oxford Square, London, and Studland, Dorset. He left an estate of £76,050.

References 

English justices of the peace
Commanders of the Order of the British Empire
1860 births
1937 deaths
Members of London County Council
English solicitors
People from Marylebone
Real estate and property developers
Liberal Party (UK) politicians